Priscilla Natalia Tapia Castillo (born 2 May 1991) is a Costa Rican footballer who plays as a goalkeeper for Club Sport Herediano the Costa Rica women's national team.

References

External links

1991 births
Living people
Women's association football goalkeepers
Costa Rican women's footballers
Costa Rica women's international footballers
Pan American Games bronze medalists for Costa Rica
Pan American Games medalists in football
Footballers at the 2019 Pan American Games
Medalists at the 2019 Pan American Games